Shoe-fitting fluoroscopes, also sold under the names X-ray Shoe Fitter, Pedoscope and Foot-o-scope, were X-ray fluoroscope machines installed in shoe stores from the 1920s until about the 1970s in the United States, Canada, United Kingdom, Australia, South Africa, Germany and Switzerland. In the UK, they were known as Pedoscopes, after the company based in St. Albans that manufactured them. An example can be seen at the Science Museum, London. At the beginning of the 1930s, Bally was the first company to import pedoscopes into Switzerland from the UK. In the second half of the 20th century, growing awareness of radiation hazards and increasingly stringent regulations forced their gradual phasing out. They were widely used particularly when buying shoes for children, whose shoe size continually changed until adulthood.

Two other viewing portholes on either side enabled the parent and a sales assistant to observe the toes being wiggled to show how much room for the toes there was inside the shoe. The bones of the feet were clearly visible, as was the outline of the shoe, including the stitching around the edges.

Invention
There are multiple claims for the invention of the shoe-fitting fluoroscope. The most likely is Jacob Lowe, who demonstrated a modified medical device at shoe retailer conventions in 1920 in Boston and in 1921 in Milwaukee. Lowe filed a US patent application in 1919, granted in 1927, and assigned it to the Adrian Company of Milwaukee for US$15,000. Syl Adrian claims that his brother, Matthew Adrian, invented and built the first machine in Milwaukee; his name is featured in a 1922 advertisement for an X-ray shoe fitter. Clarence Karrer, the son of an X-ray equipment distributor, claims to have built the first unit in 1924 in Milwaukee, but had his idea stolen and patented by one of his father's employees. In the meantime, the British company Pedoscope filed a British patent application in 1924, granted in 1926, and claimed to have been building these machines since 1920.

The X-ray Shoe Fitter Corporation of Milwaukee and Pedoscope Company became the largest manufacturers of shoe-fitting fluoroscopes in the world.

Health concerns

The risk of radiation burns to extremities was known since Wilhelm Röntgen's 1895 experiment, but this was a short-term effect with early warning from reddening of the skin (erythema). The long-term risks from chronic exposure to radiation began to emerge with Hermann Joseph Muller's 1927 paper showing genetic effects, and the incidence of bone cancer in radium dial painters of the same time period. However, there was not enough data to quantify the level of risk until atomic bomb survivors began to experience the long-term effects of radiation in the late 1940s. The first scientific evaluations of these machines in 1948 immediately sparked concern for radiation protection and electrical safety reasons, and found them ineffective at shoe fitting.

Large variations in dose were possible depending on the machine design, displacement of the shielding materials, and the duration and frequency of use. Radiation surveys showed that American machines delivered an average of 13 roentgen (r) (roughly 0.13 sievert (Sv) of equivalent dose in modern units) to the customer's feet during a typical 20-second viewing, with one capable of delivering 116 r (~1 Sv) in 20 seconds. British Pedoscopes produced about ten times less radiation.

A customer might try several shoes in a day, or return several times in a year, and radiation dose effects may be cumulative. A dose of 300 r can cause growth disturbance in a child, and 600 r can cause erythema in an adult. Hands and feet are relatively resistant to other forms of radiation damage, such as carcinogenesis.

Although most of the dose was directed at the feet, a substantial amount would scatter or leak in all directions. Shielding materials were sometimes displaced to improve image quality, to make the machine lighter, or out of carelessness, and this aggravated the leakage. The resulting whole-body dose may have been hazardous to the salesmen, who were chronically exposed, and to children, who are about twice as radiosensitive as adults. Monitoring of American salespersons found dose rates at pelvis height of up to 95 mr/week, with an average of 7.1 mr/week (up to ~50 mSv/a, avg ~3.7 mSv/an effective dose). A 2007 paper suggested that even higher doses of 0.5 Sv/a were plausible. The most widely accepted model of radiation-induced cancer posits that the incidence of cancers due to ionizing radiation increases linearly with effective (i.e., whole-body) dose.

Years or decades may elapse between radiation exposure and a related occurrence of cancer, and no follow-up studies of customers can be performed for lack of records. According to a 1950 medical article on the machines: "Present evidence indicates that at least some radiation injuries are statistical processes that do not have a threshold. If this evidence is valid, there is no exposure which is absolutely safe and which produces no effect." Three shoe salespersons were identified with rare conditions that might have been associated with their chronic occupational exposure: a severe radiation burn requiring amputation in 1950, a case of dermatitis with ulceration in 1957,  and a case of basal-cell carcinoma of the sole in 2004.

Shoe industry response 
Representatives of the shoe retail industry denied claims of potential harm in newspaper articles and opinion pieces. They argued that use of the devices prevented harm to customers' feet from poorly-fitted shoes.

Regulation

There were no applicable regulations when shoe-fitting fluoroscopes were introduced. An estimated 10,000 machines were sold in the US, 3,000 in the UK, 1,500 in Switzerland, and 1,000 in Canada before authorities began discouraging their use. As understanding grew of the long-term health effects of radiation, a variety of bodies began speaking out and regulating the machines.

In popular culture
 Young Eddie Kaspbrak uses a shoe-fitting fluoroscope in a memory near the beginning of the novel It by Stephen King.
  In the novel The House Without a Christmas Tree, the young protagonist Addie Mills describes these machines.
 In 1999, Time placed Shoe-Store X Rays on a list of the 100 worst ideas of the 20th century.
 A shoe-fitting fluoroscope appeared on a 2011 episode of the History series American Restoration. Its radionuclide source was found to be so dangerous that it was removed and replaced with a static X-ray.
 A shoe-fitting fluoroscope can be seen near the beginning of the film Billion Dollar Brain starring Michael Caine.

References

External links

 A Guide for Uniform Industrial Hygiene Codes Or Regulations For The Use Of Fluoroscopic Shoe Fitting Devices. American Conference of Governmental Industrial Hygienists.

Patents
 
 

Shoe business
Fluoroscopy
Radiation health effects